The Panasonic M2 is a video game console platform developed by 3DO and then sold to Matsushita, a company known outside Japan by the brand Panasonic. Initially announced as a peripheral chip for the 3DO Interactive Multiplayer, it was later unveiled as a standalone console. The console was cancelled in 1997, but the M2 technology was incorporated into other devices.

Development kits and prototypes of the machine became very valuable pieces among collectors. M2's technology was integrated in the multimedia players FZ-21S and FZ-35S, both released in 1998. Both products were aimed at professionals working in medicine, architecture, and sales, but not home users. The M2 also became a short-lived arcade board by Konami. The agreement to develop the board was made well in advance of the M2 console's planned release date, with the understanding that games using the arcade board would be ported to the home console, similar to the relationship between the PlayStation and Namco System 11. Because games ran straight from the CD-ROM drive, it suffered from long load times and a high failure rate, so only five games were developed for it.

The M2 technology was later used in automated teller machines, and in Japan in coffee vending machines.

In the late 1990s and from 2000 on, the system was also sold in the interactive kiosk market. In 2000, PlanetWeb, Inc. began offering software to allow the M2 to be used as an Internet appliance. All of the software released for the M2 kiosks was developed with the "CDMotion for M2/M2X" software, which was a point and click "codeless" SDK for M2. None of the applications utilized the Macintosh based SDK in conjunction with Macintosh Programmers Workbench.

History
As with the 3DO Interactive Multiplayer, the M2 hardware was co-designed by Dave Needle and R. J. Mical. First announced as a peripheral chip for the 3DO Interactive Multiplayer with a custom PowerPC microprocessor, the M2 eventually became a standalone console and was exhibited and demonstrated at the 1995 Electronic Entertainment Expo. For a time, the M2 was scheduled to be released both as a standalone unit and as an add-on chip. In 1996, an M2 developer stated that he didn't think an M2 add-on chip was possible because the 3DO Interactive Multiplayer and M2 architectures were too vastly different from each other.

Initially the plan was for the 3DO Company to license the console to multiple manufacturers, as it had done with the 3DO Interactive Multiplayer, and both Matsushita (Panasonic) and GoldStar were signed on to produce M2 units. However, 3DO later sold exclusive rights to the M2 to Panasonic and relinquished their involvement with the console over the next several months. Several of the M2's third party developers expressed concern that Panasonic would be unable to give them the same high quality development support that they had been receiving from 3DO, and said that in light of this they were reconsidering whether it would be worth the effort of learning how to develop for the M2. For several months Panasonic and Sega were discussing a partnership over the M2, but talks between the two companies broke down in the second quarter of 1996. According to 3DO president Trip Hawkins, "The deal was virtually done. It only fell apart at the last minute."

According to Omid Kordestani, a 3DO spokesperson, the M2 could generate 1 million polygons per second with the graphics features turned off and 700,000 polygons per second with the features turned on. There were plans to make M2 models with built-in DVD players, similar to the later PlayStation 2. According to 3DO senior vice president of hardware engineering Toby Farrand, "M2 was designed knowing that we would make it a DVD capable player."

A review in Next Generation published well before the console's planned release gave it four out of five stars, claiming that the M2 was several times as powerful as any gaming console then on the market. They also praised the 3DO Company's strategies for securing third party support for the system, and concluded that "M2 has crossed the line from being a collection of fanciful tech specs to hard silicon that people can work on and believe in."

The M2 failed to appear at the 1996 Electronic Entertainment Expo; a Panasonic spokesperson at the show said they were still undecided on how they were going to use the M2 technology, and that it was no longer certain as a gaming platform. By the end of 1996 a release date was not yet set for the console, and third party developers were stating that in practice the M2 was not significantly more powerful than the Nintendo 64. Electronic Gaming Monthly summarized the M2 situation at this time: "Some months, it seems the boat is still afloat: Rumors crop up of a public showing, new demos come out or a Matsushita official doles out some tantalizing hints. Other months, it seems the boat has capsized, with developers scrambling to get off the boat while they still can."

Matsushita cancelled the project in mid-1997, unwilling to compete against fellow Japanese electronics giant Sony's PlayStation and Nintendo's Nintendo 64, both of which had recently had several top-selling games released for them. Word of this leaked in late May, but it was not until July that the console's cancellation was made public, via an announcement by Matsushita president Yoichi Morishita. The M2 was canceled so close to release, marketing had already taken place in the form of flyers, and several of its prospected launch titles had gameplay screens in circulation.

In October 1997 Matsushita announced that they were marketing the M2 hardware as an industrial system capable of custom multimedia applications for simulations.

Technical specifications
Central processing unit – Dual 66 MHz PowerPC 602
Implements the 32-bit PowerPC RISC instruction set architecture
PowerPC CPU designed for consumer electronics applications
1.2 watts power usage each
32-bit general purpose registers and ALU
33 MHz 64-bit multiplexed address and data bus
4 KiB data and instruction caches (Level 1). No Level 2 cache
1 integer unit, 1 floating point unit, no branch processing unit, 1 load/store unit
SPECint92 rating of 40 each, approximately 70 MIPS each.
1 million transistors manufactured on a 0.50 micrometre CMOS process
Custom ASICs cohabiting on the motherboard
BDA:
Memory control, system control, and video/graphic control
Full triangle renderer including setup engine, MPEG-1 decoder hardware, DSP for audio and various kinds of DMA control and port access
Random access of frame buffer and z-buffer (actually w-buffer) possible at the same time
CDE:
Power bus connected to BDA and the two CPUs
"bio-bus" used as a low-speed bus for peripheral hardware
Renderer capabilities:
1 million un-textured triangles/s geometry rate
100 million pixels/s fill rate
reportedly 700,000 textured polygons/second without gouraud shading or additional effects
reportedly 500,000 textured polygons/second with gouraud shading, lighting and effects
shading: flat shading and gouraud shading
texture mapping
decal, modulation blending, tiling (16k/128k texture buffer built-in)
hardware z-buffer (16-bit) (actually a block floating point with multiple (4) range w-buffer)
object-based full-scene anti-aliasing
alpha channel (4-bit or 7-bit)
320x240 to 640x480 resolution at 24-bit color
Sound hardware – 16-bit 32-channel DSP at 66 MHz (within BDA chip)
Media – Quad-speed CD-ROM drive (600 KB/s)
RAM – Unified memory subsystem with 8 MiB
64-bit bus resulting in peak 528 MB/s bandwidth
Average access 400 MB/s
Full Motion Video – MPEG-1
Writable Storage – Memory cards from 128 KiB to 32 MiB
Expansion Capabilities – 1 PCMCIA port (potentially used for modems, Ethernet NICs, etc.)

Accessories
The M2 gamepad was to have six buttons positioned by the right thumb and two shoulder buttons, much like the standard Sega Saturn gamepad, and a D-pad surrounded by a rotating analog wheel.

Games
In late 1995 four M2 games in development had been shown to the public: ClayFighter III, Descent, Ironblood (later released for the PlayStation as Iron & Blood: Warriors of Ravenloft), and an untitled racing game by Studio 3DO (presumably IMSA Racing). A fifth game, D2 (a sequel to D), was previewed early the following year. Studio 3DO also claimed to be working on a version of BattleSport for M2. Other confirmed M2 projects include Return Fire 2; Power Crystal, an RPG by British developer Perceptions; a rail shooter developed by Genki; and NFLPA Superstars, a 6v6 backyard football game by Condor (later renamed Blizzard North), whose budget of nearly $1m helped the company financially during the development of Diablo. A game based on the film Escape from L.A. was announced in 1996, but may not have entered development.

In 1996, a Top Gun game was in development by Spectrum Holobyte but was never released.

Capcom and Konami were both later confirmed to be licensed M2 developers.

Ultra Game Players magazine reported in its July 1997 issue that, according to a former 3DO employee, nearly 80 games were in development for the M2.

In 2010 the only completed M2 game, IMSA Racing, was made available to the public.

In January of 2020, a compilation demo disc was released by the YouTube channel “Video Game Esoterica”. The disc contains twelve diverse demos from the development period of M2 and includes the only known playable files of the M2 version of D2.

Konami arcade games based on M2
 Tobe! Polystars (1997)
 Total Vice (1997)
 Battle Tryst (1998)
 Evil Night / Hell Night (1998)
 Heat of Eleven '98 / The World Soccer Championship (1998)

References

Further reading

External links
Games That Weren't 3DO/M2  – A website about unreleased 3DO M2 games
Video Game Esoterica M2 Demi Disc Release

3DO Interactive Multiplayer
CD-ROM-based consoles
M2
PowerPC-based video game consoles
Sixth-generation video game consoles
Vaporware game consoles
Home video game consoles